York Theatre is an off-Broadway theatre company based in East Midtown Manhattan, New York City. In its 50th year, York Theatre is dedicated to the production of new musicals and concert productions of forgotten musicals from the past. Each season consists of three or four mainstage productions, six or more concert presentations and dozens of developmental readings. It has had several transfers of its work to larger off-Broadway theatres and to Broadway. The company was awarded a special Drama Desk Award in 1996 to its artistic director Janet Hayes Walker and in 2006 for its "vital contributions to theater by developing and presenting new musicals". The York also received a Special Achievement Outer Critics Circle Award for 50 years of producing new and classic musicals. After Walker's death in 1997, the company has been run by James Morgan.

From 1993 to 2020, the company performed at St. Peter's Church in the Citigroup Center at 619 Lexington Avenue at the corner of East 54th Street.

The York Theatre is producing at The Theatre at St. Jeans (150 East 76th Street & Lexington Avenue) due to a January 2021 flood from a city water main break that destroyed their home of 30 years at Saint Peter's Church.

Oscar Hammerstein Award
The Oscar Hammerstein Award named in honor of American lyricist and librettist Oscar Hammerstein was created in 1988 by Janet Hayes Walker, the founding artistic director of the York Theatre Company, and is presented with the endorsement of the Rodgers & Hammerstein Organization and the Hammerstein family. The Oscar Hammerstein Award Gala is the major annual fundraising event of the York Theatre.

York Theatre Company presentations
(Selective)
(* indicates The York productions that have had commercial transfers)
The Golden Apple
The Grass Harp
On the 20th Century
A Doll's Life
Lost in the Stars
Carnival!
Merrily We Roll Along

Recent Mainstage productions include:
Enter Laughing: The Musical
Midnight at The Never Get
Unexpected Joy
Desperate Measures*
Marry Harry (by Biello & Martin)
A Taste of Things to Come
You're a Good Man, Charlie Brown
Rothschild & Sons
Cagney*
Texas in Paris
Inventing Mary Martin
Love, Linda: The Life of Mrs. Cole Porter
Storyville
I'm a Stranger Here Myself
Closer Than Ever (won Best Musical Revival, Off-Broadway Alliance Award)
Ionescapade
The Road to Qatar!
Falling for Eve
Yank!
Blind Lemon Blues
Enter Laughing
Asylum
Thrill Me
Souvenir*
The Musical of Musicals (The Musical!)*
Jolson & Company*
Sweeney Todd*
Pacific Overtures*
Anything Can Happen in the Theatre - The Musical World of Maury Yeston
Forbidden Broadway: The Next Generation
Cheek to Cheek: Irving Berlin in Hollywood (2021)
Penelope, or How The Odyssey Was Really Written
Cheek to Cheek: Irving Berlin in Hollywood (2022)
Hoagy Carmichael's Stardust Road (Coming November 2022)

References

External links 
 
 
 

Off-Broadway theaters
Theatres in Manhattan
Theatres completed in 1993
1993 establishments in New York City
Midtown Manhattan